White Christmas is the tenth studio album (and first Christmas album) released by Australian singer Peter Andre. The album was released on 21 November 2014.

Promotion
Andre performed his original song "Christmas Time's For Family" on 4Music.

Track listing
"Rockin' Around the Christmas Tree" - 2:07
"Let It Snow" - 3:17
"White Christmas" - 2:53
"Christmas Time's for Family" - 3:20
"I Saw Mommy Kissing Santa Claus" - 3:00
"Jingle Bell Rock" - 2:28
"Last Christmas" - 4:18
"Most Wonderful Time of the Year" - 2:56
"Driving Home for Christmas" - 2:54
"Silent Night" - 3:34

References

Peter Andre albums
2014 Christmas albums
Christmas albums by Australian artists
Pop Christmas albums